Thomas Linard (born 24 March 1988) is a French professional golfer.

In 2013 Linard finished 7th in the Alps Tour Order of Merit to earn promotion to the Challenge Tour.

He picked up his first Challenge Tour win in June 2014 at the D+D Real Czech Challenge.

Professional wins (1)

Challenge Tour wins (1)

See also
2015 Challenge Tour graduates

References

External links

French male golfers
European Tour golfers
Golfers from Paris
Sportspeople from Bourges
1988 births
Living people
21st-century French people